Moonpark is an Argentine music festival, held three times annually since 2003.  It is held in the Northeast of Buenos Aires city.  It is considered one of the most important dance and electronic music festivals in the country.

Some of the acts performed during its last editions included  Nick Warren, John Digweed, Sasha, Hernán Cattáneo, Satoshi Tomiie, Danny Howells, Carl Cox, Steve Lawler, Danny Tenaglia, James Zabiela, S.O.S., Luke Fair, Richie Hawtin and Loco Dice.

See also

List of electronic music festivals
Live electronic music
List of music festivals in Argentina

References

External links
 Moonpark

Music festivals established in 2003
Festivals in Buenos Aires
2003 establishments in Argentina
Electronic music festivals in Argentina